Linton Public Library, also known as the Margaret Cooper Library, is a historic library building located at Linton, Greene County, Indiana.  It was designed by noted Chicago architecture firm Patton & Miller and built in 1908.  It is a -story, "T"-plan, Tudor Revival style building with Arts and Crafts style design elements. It has a steeply pitched gable roof with French clay tile.  The first story is of brick and upper story sheathed in stucco with half-timbering.

It was listed on the National Register of Historic Places in 2000.

References

Libraries on the National Register of Historic Places in Indiana
Tudor Revival architecture in Indiana
Library buildings completed in 1908
Buildings and structures in Greene County, Indiana
National Register of Historic Places in Greene County, Indiana
1908 establishments in Indiana